Canciones Prohibidas is the seventh studio album by Spanish hard rock band Extremoduro. It was produced by Iñaki "Uoho" Antón, recorded and published by DRO on 28 September 1998.

Track listing
Lyrics by Roberto Iniesta, music by Roberto Iniesta and Iñaki Antón.

Personnel 
Extremoduro
 Roberto "Robe" Iniesta – Vocals, guitar, fuzz bass, tambourine...
 Iñaki "Uoho" Antón – Guitar, bass, piano, organ, trombone, percussion instrument, backing vocals...
 José Ignacio Cantera – Drums
Additional personnel
 Mikel Irazoki – Bass
 Arkadiusz Tomasz Czyzewski – Violin
 Iwona Przyzecka – Violin
 Iwona Skrzypczak – Viola
 Jurek Andrzejczak – Cello
 Carlos "Alma" Almaguer Torres – Percussion instrument
 Joseba Molina "Canario" – Bandurria and laúd
 Garikoitz Badiola "Gari" – Trombone
 Patxi Urtxegi – Trumpet and flugelhorn

Charts and certifications

Chart performance

Certifications

References

External links 
 Extremoduro official website (in Spanish)

1998 albums
Extremoduro albums
Spanish-language albums